Lola Hoffmann (also known as Helena Jacoby) (March 19, 1904 – April 30, 1988) was a German Jewish Chileanphysiologist and psychiatrist.

Early life and education
Lola (Helena) was born in Riga, then part of the Russian Empire, to a well-off German-speaking Lutheran family of Jewish origin. Her father participated in the movement led by Alexander Kerenski. He was persecuted by the Bolsheviks, who occupied Latvia following the First World War. When Lola was 15, her family moved to Freiburg in Breisgau, Germany. Lola enrolled in the School of Medicine of Freiburg and stayed when her family decided to return to Riga.

Career

Physiology 
After finishing her thesis on the suprarenal glands of rats, Hoffmann left Freiburg and moved to Berlin, where she became an assistant of Paul Trendelenburg, who specialised in hormones. In 1931, she moved to Chile with her lover Franz Hoffman.

During her first year in Chile, she dedicated herself to learning Spanish and to immersing herself in Chilean culture. She then worked at the Bacteriological Institute as her husband's assistant at the newly founded Institute of Physiology of the University of Chile. They researched, published papers, and travelled together. She worked at the Institute of Physiology from 1938 to 1951.

Psychiatry 
After more than 20 years of experimental work in physiology, Lola started losing enthusiasm for her work, eventually falling into depression. While traveling to Europe for a trip with her husband, she read a book called The Psychology of C. G. Jung, by Jolande Jacoby. After arriving in Zurich, she contacted the author of the book, Yolanda Jacoby. Their talks, along with other experiences, led her to make a decision to abandon physiology and become a psychiatrist.

When she returned to Chile, she began achieving her goal of becoming a psychiatrist. At first she worked alone, annotating and analyzing her dreams. She then started work at the Psychiatric Clinic of the University of Chile. In her explorative studies she started practicing “autogenic training,” a method of self-hypnosis developed by the German neurologist, Johannes Heinrich Schultz. She was also inspired by the work of Ernst Kretschmer.

After 5 years working in the Psychiatric Clinic, Hoffman felt the need for more in-depth study. She applied for a fellowship in the Psychiatric Clinic of Tübingen, Germany. She remained in Tübingen for one year and then moved to Zurich for another year, where she attended the last conferences given by Jung. The ideas she picked up during these conferences would be key to her later work as a psychotherapist.

After returning to Chile in 1959, she returned to the Psychiatric Clinic of the University of Chile, where she joined one of the first trials of group therapy and a controlled group experimentation with LSD and marijuana.

Personal life
While conducting research, she met a Chilean doctor, Franz Hoffmann, who was doing post-doctoral work there in Physiology. They worked together and fell in love, and they returned to Chile together in 1931. Her immediate family also followed her to Chile in 1934.

Her new career necessarily meant that she spent more and more time away from her husband, widening her circle of friends and colleagues. The Chilean sculptor and poet, Totila Albert, helped Lola during her transition, as she made the dramatic break with her former scientific world of physiology and moved into the world of psychiatry. They became close friends and lovers for 17 years, until his death in 1967.

However, Lola did not break off her marriage. She still considered Franz to be her life-mate, but she had become convinced that exclusive pair relationships were a hypocritical custom imposed upon society. She thought that parallel relationships contributed to the proper growth of the couple.

She and Franz continued living together on the same family property on North Pedro de Valdivia Street, but with each one occupying their own house, while staying in constant communication and sharing many meals.

Lola advocated the dismantling of the patriarchal system that dominated society. She felt this was necessary to do in order for men and women to become fulfilled human beings. Totila Albert had influenced in this regard, and she felt indebted to him for this perspective on male-female relationships. She was convinced that the patriarchal system prevented free and fully rewarding relationships.

Totila Albert died in 1967 and a few months later her husband, Franz Hoffman, suffered a stroke that left him paralyzed on the right side. Later he became totally paralyzed, and Lola took care of him for the rest of his life, until his death 13 years later in 1981.

Later years
When Hoffman was 60 years old, she began to suffer from glaucoma. After many operations, her right eye had to be removed. Later glaucoma also developed in her healthy left eye, and soon she was almost blind, although she continued to read by using a magnifying glass.

After 1964, Lola became increasingly involved in Eastern meditation techniques and philosophy. She began practicing Hatha yoga, t'ai chi and psychodance. After reading Richard Wilhelm's German translation of the classic Chinese text, I Ching, the Book of Changes, and she decided to write a Spanish translation of I Ching, finishing in 1971.

She became gravely ill in 1983, five years before her death. During this time she had a religious experience which reaffirmed her faith in God.

Although Lola believed in individual change, most of her life she avoided political action. However, she decided to join the Planetary Initiative for the World We Choose when it came to Chile in 1983. In fact, she was the main speaker at the first session held in Chile. During the final years of her life, she participated in several collective actions and she became a founding member of La Casa de la Paz in 1985.

Her last four years were spent in Peñalolén, a suburb of Santiago, on land belonging to her daughter, renowned botanist Adriana Hoffmann. There they build a near exact replica of her house.

In her final years she frequently experienced altered states of consciousness. She continued seeing her patients, students and friends up to weeks before she died. Upon getting up one night, she fell and broke her hip. A few days later, at 84 years of age, she died in Santiago.

References

 Malú Sierra: Sueños, un camino al despertar, Editorial Puerta Abierta, Santiago, Chile, 1988.
 Delia Vergara: Encuentros con Lola Hoffmann, Editorial Puerta Abierta, Santiago, Chile, 1989.
 Leonora Calderón: Mi abuela Lola Hoffmann, Cuatro Vientos Editorial, Santiago, Chile, 1994.
 Murra, John V. and M. López-Baralt (editors.): Las cartas de Arguedas. Lima: Pontificia Universidad Católica del Perú Fondo Editorial, 1996 (consists of the letters of the writer José María Arguedas to Lola Hoffmann).

Baltic-German people
Chilean psychologists
Chilean women psychologists
Chilean psychiatrists
1904 births
1988 deaths
Physicians from Riga
Latvian emigrants to Chile
Women psychiatrists
20th-century psychologists